Mike Muscat (born May 22, 1952) is an American actor. He has played an assortment roles in various television shows, including Totally Outrageous Behavior and The Strange Case of Dr. Jekyll and Mr. Hyde.

Career
One of Muscat's earliest roles was in the 1973 film, The Last American Hero which starred Jeff Bridges and Valerie Perrine. The following year he had a supporting role as Clarence in the 1974 film Hot Summer in Barefoot County. He was Howard Tindell in the William Malone directed horror / sci-fi  film, Scared to Death. 1996 saw him in the Frank Harris directed The Patriot. It was a film about stolen atomic bombs which starred Gregg Henry, Leslie Nielsen and Stack Pierce. Muscat had a role as Uncle Ralph in the film Horrorween. He was also one of the writers for the film.

Filmography (selective)

References

External links

Living people
1952 births
American male television actors
American male film actors
People from Fort Bragg, California